FT8 or Franke & Taylor 8 is a frequency shift keying digital mode of radio communication. Following release on June 29, 2017, by its creators Joe Taylor, K1JT, and Steve Franke, K9AN, along with the software package WSJT, FT8 was adopted rapidly and, in little over two years, it became the most popular digital mode on spotting networks such as PSK Reporter.

Introduction
FT8 is a popular form of digital weak signal communication used primarily by amateur radio operators to communicate on amateur radio bands with a majority of traffic occurring on the HF amateur bands. The mode offers operators the ability to communicate in unfavorable environments such as during low sun spot numbers, high RF noise, or during low power operations.  With advances in signal processing technology FT8 is able to decode signals with a signal to noise ratio as low as −20 dB, which is significantly lower than CW or SSB transmissions.

Operation
FT8 works by sending signals in 15-second-blocks with 12.64 seconds of transmission time and 2.36 seconds of decode time, this gives the mode five words per minutes effective transmission. The mode requires both sending and receiving computers to be synchronised so, while manual time setting is possible, most users make use of automatic online time servers using NTP or by receiving broadcast time signals from the GPS to ensure their transmissions fall in the proper windows.

Each FT8 transmission can support up to 13 text characters, coded using forward error correction to ensure proper transmission and decoding despite common radio effects such as fading, interference or poor signal propagation conditions, or low power operation with compromised antennas in restricted urban spaces. As the mode is quite limited in the number of words that it can send, it only sends enough information to ensure a contact with each station.

Applications
There are multiple uses for FT8 including contesting, testing antennas, and for scientific research.

References 

Amateur radio
Quantized radio modulation modes
Data transmission